"The Curse of Yig" is a short story by H. P. Lovecraft and Zealia Bishop in which Yig, "The Father of Serpents", is first introduced.

Plot
In 1889, upon arriving in Oklahoma, a couple learn about local legends surrounding a "snake god" called Yig, which takes vengeance on anyone who kills a serpent by either killing them or turning them into a half-snake monster. The husband has an intense fear of snakes, and his wife kills a nest of rattlesnakes at one of their campsites. The husband is horrified by the thought that Yig will take vengeance. After building their cabin, the husband is insistent on practicing various rituals from the native tribes to keep Yig away, grating heavily on his wife's nerves. In fear, the woman kills her own husband in the dark, thinking he is Yig. She is taken to an asylum, and dies there... but not before giving birth to four half-snake creatures.

Background
Bishop supplied the story idea and some notes, paying Lovecraft to flesh it out in 1928. Bishop then sold the story under her own name to Weird Tales magazine. It was published first in the November 1929 issue (volume 14, number 5) on pages 625-36.

It was the first of three tales Lovecraft wrote with Bishop, the others being The Mound and Medusa's Coil.

Republication
The story has appeared in a number of horror anthologies, including:

A Treasury of American Horror Stories, ed. Frank D. McSherry, Jr., Charles G. Waugh & Martin H. Greenberg, Bonanza/Crown Books 1985,  
Tales of the Dark #3, ed. Lincoln Child, St. Martin's Press 1988 
The Horror in the Museum and Other Revisions, H. P. Lovecraft, Arkham House 1989

References

External links
 
 
 Online text

1929 short stories
Cthulhu Mythos short stories
Fantasy short stories
Collaborative short stories
Mariticide in fiction
Oklahoma in fiction
Short stories by H. P. Lovecraft
Works originally published in Weird Tales
Native Americans in popular culture